Ella Eastin (born March 28, 1997) is an American swimmer specializing in the individual medley and butterfly events.

College career
Eastin swam for the Stanford Cardinal, and is a twelve-time NCAA champion. 

During her freshman season, she set an American record in the 200-yard individual medley. At the 2016 NCAA Championships, she won the 200-yard and 400-yard individual medleys, and placed second behind Kelsi Worrell in the 200-yard butterfly.

During the first day of the 2017 NCAA Championships, Eastin, along with her teammates Simone Manuel, Lia Neal, and Katie Ledecky, set a record of 6:45.91 in the 800-yard freestyle relay. She lost the 200-yard individual medley to Kathleen Baker, but successfully defended her 400-yard individual medley title by breaking teammate Katie Ledecky's American record. She also added a win in the 200-yard butterfly.

In the 2018 NCAA Championships, Eastin set new NCAA and American records in the 200-yard individual medley with a time of 1:50.67, and she shattered Katie Ledecky's American record in the 400-yard individual medley by almost two seconds, with a time of 3:54.60. She also won the 200-yard butterfly, and she was a member of the winning relay teams in the 400-yard and 800-yard relays. Eastin was named Swimmer of the Meet.

In the 2019 NCAA Championships, Eastin won the 400-yard individual medley, and in so doing became the only woman to win four consecutive national titles in the event. She finished second in the 200-yard individual medley and in the 200-yard butterfly. She and her teammates Grace Zhao, Amalie Fackenthal, and Anya Goeders won the 200-yard medley relay. She and her teammates Katie Drabot, Taylor Ruck, and Brooke Forde took silver in the 800-yard freestyle relay.

2016 international season
She won silver in the women's 400 metre individual medley at the 2016 FINA World Swimming Championships (25 m).  She had originally finished 3rd, but was elevated to silver, along with teammate Madisyn Cox being elevated to bronze, when Anh Vien Nguyen was disqualified from second place.

2017
During the 2017 Phillips 66 National Championships, Eastin grabbed second place behind Leah Smith in the 400 metre individual medley, technically qualifying her for the 2017 World Aquatics Championships in Budapest, but was disqualified for the Lochte rule.

She was named a team captain for the 2017 World University Games in Taipei.

References

External links
 
 

1997 births
Living people
American female medley swimmers
American female butterfly swimmers
American female freestyle swimmers
Medalists at the FINA World Swimming Championships (25 m)
Universiade medalists in swimming
Universiade gold medalists for the United States
Universiade silver medalists for the United States
Place of birth missing (living people)
Stanford Cardinal women's swimmers
Medalists at the 2017 Summer Universiade
Medalists at the 2019 Summer Universiade
21st-century American women